Cult Hero is a Canadian thriller comedy film, directed by Jesse Thomas Cook and released in 2022. The film stars Liv Collins as Kallie Jones, a real estate agent and stereotypical "Karen" in Owen Sound, Ontario, whose husband Brad (Justin Bott) gets drawn into a death cult led by Master Jagori (Tony Burgess), forcing her to team up with "cult buster" Dale Domazar (Ry Barrett) to rescue him.

The cast also includes Jessica Vano, Charlie Baker, Jonathan Craig, Justin Darmanin, Steve Kasan, Michael Masurkevitch, Marcia Alderson, Zoë Woodrow, Matt Griffin, Ross Docherty, James Mercier, Alex Bonwick, Donna Henry and Greg Collins.

Production and distribution
The film was shot in and around Owen Sound in fall 2021.

The film was screened for distributors in the Frontières program at the Marché du Film in May 2022, prior to its public premiere on July 30, 2022, at the Fantasia International Film Festival.

Awards

References

External links

2022 films
2022 comedy films
2022 thriller films
Canadian comedy thriller films
2020s English-language films
2020s Canadian films
English-language Canadian films